Mercat Press is an imprint of the Edinburgh, Scotland-based publishing company Birlinn Limited. It was established in 1970 as a subsidiary of the bookseller James Thin, and published facsimile editions of out-of-print Scottish works, such as the five-volume The Castellated and Domestic Architecture of Scotland by MacGibbon and Ross. Mercat was bought out by its management after James Thin went into administration in 2002, becoming an independent publisher. In 2007 Mercat Press was taken over by Birlinn Limited, another Edinburgh-based publishing house, who now publish outdoor books, such as walking, climbing and cycling guides, under the Mercat imprint.

Notable authors and works

Martin C. Strong 
 The Great Scots Discography (2002)

References

External links
 Mercat, an imprint of Birlinn Limited

Book publishing companies of Scotland
Companies based in Edinburgh
Publishing companies established in 1970
1970 establishments in Scotland